The following article is a summary of the 2015–16 football season in Georgia, and ran from August 2015 to May 2016.

National teams results

Men

2015

2016

League tables

Umaglesi Liga

Results:

Pirveli Liga

Meore Liga

Georgian Cup Final
Final match hold on 18 May 2016 in Kutaisi.

References

 
Seasons in Georgian football